The Test Methods Regulation is a Regulation (European Union) No. 440/2008 of May 30, 2008.  It, and its subsequent amendments, define tests, testing of chemicals for the REACH Regulation.  They are based on the OECD Guidelines for the Testing of Chemicals.

External links 
 http://eur-lex.europa.eu/legal-content/EN/TXT/?uri=CELEX:32008R0440
 https://web.archive.org/web/20110928164636/http://ihcp.jrc.ec.europa.eu/our_activities/alt-animal-testing/test_method_reg/

Regulation of chemicals
Toxicology
European Union regulations